The 2012 World Junior Curling Championships was held from March 3 to 11 at the Z-Hallen in Östersund, Sweden. Östersund previously hosted the World Junior Curling Championships in 1999 and in 2008.

In the men's final, Canada's Brendan Bottcher defeated Sweden's Rasmus Wranå in eight ends with a score of 10–4. Scotland's Kyle Smith secured the men's bronze medal with a 7–3 win over Norway's Markus Høiberg. In the women's final, Scotland's Hannah Fleming defeated the Czech Republic's Zuzana Hájková in an extra end with a score of 6–5. Russia's Anna Sidorova won over Sweden's Sara McManus in nine ends to win the women's bronze medal with a score of 7–4.

Canadian women's skip Jocelyn Peterman and Norwegian men's lead Sander Rølvåg were awarded with the 2012 World Curling Federation World Junior Sportsmanship Awards. They were chosen by fellow players at the World Junior Championships based on their values of sportsmanship and fair play.

As the last placed European teams, three teams, Italy on the women's side and Italy and Finland on the men's side, will be relegated to the 2013 European Junior Curling Challenge, where teams not already qualified for the 2013 World Junior Curling Championships will have to play to qualify for the worlds.

Men

Teams
Canada, the Czech Republic, Finland, Norway, Scotland, Sweden, Switzerland, and the United States qualified by virtue of their performance at last year's championships. Italy qualified from the European Junior Curling Challenge, and China qualified from the Pacific Junior Curling Championships.

The teams are listed as follows:

Round Robin Standings
Final Round Robin Standings

Round-robin results
All draw times are listed in Central European Time (UTC+01).

Draw 1
Saturday, March 3, 14:00

Draw 2
Sunday, March 4, 9:00

Draw 3
Sunday, March 4, 19:00

Draw 4
Monday, March 5, 14:00

Draw 5
Tuesday, March 6, 9:00

Draw 6
Tuesday, March 6, 19:00

Draw 7
Wednesday, March 7, 14:00

Draw 8
Thursday, March 8, 8:00

Draw 9
Thursday, March 8, 17:00

Playoffs

1 vs. 2 Game
Saturday, March 10, 12:00

3 vs. 4 Game
Saturday, March 10, 12:00

Semifinal
Saturday, March 10, 18:00

Bronze-medal game
Sunday, March 11, 13:00

Gold-medal game
Sunday, March 11, 13:00

Women

Teams
Canada, the Czech Republic, Norway, Russia, Scotland, Sweden, Switzerland, and the United States qualified by virtue of their performance at last year's championships. Italy qualified from the European Junior Curling Challenge,  and Japan qualified from the Pacific Junior Curling Championships.

The teams are listed as follows:

Round Robin Standings
Final Round Robin Standings

Round-robin results
All draw times are listed in Central European Time (UTC+01).

Draw 1
Saturday, March 3, 9:00

Draw 2
Saturday, March 3, 19:00

Draw 3
Sunday, March 4, 14:00

Draw 4
Monday, March 5, 9:00

Draw 5
Monday, March 5, 19:00

Draw 6
Tuesday, March 6, 14:00

Draw 7
Wednesday, March 7, 9:00

Draw 8
Wednesday, March 7, 19:00

Draw 9
Thursday, March 8, 12:30

Tiebreakers
Friday, March 9, 9:00
Third-place game

Fourth-place game

Playoffs

1 vs. 2 Game
Friday, March 9, 19:00

3 vs. 4 Game
Friday, March 9, 19:00

Semifinal
Saturday, March 10, 18:00

Bronze-medal game
Sunday, March 11, 9:00

Gold-medal game
Sunday, March 11, 9:00

References

External links

Home Page

2012 in curling
World Junior Curling Championships
International curling competitions hosted by Sweden
World Junior Curling Championships
Sports competitions in Östersund
March 2012 sports events in Europe
2012 in youth sport